The following is a list of MTV Asia Awards winners for Favorite Artist Thailand.

MTV Asia Awards